António Teixeira Lopes (27 October 1866–21 June 1942) was a Portuguese sculptor.

Life 
Teixeira Lopes was the son of sculptor José Joaquim Teixeira Lopes and started learning his art in his father's workshop. In 1882 he entered the Academy of Fine Arts (Escola de Belas Artes) in Porto, where he continued his education with celebrated artists like sculptor António Soares dos Reis and painter João Marques de Oliveira. In 1885 he left for Paris, where he entered the École des Beaux-Arts and became a distinguished student.

Around 1895, together with his brother, architect José Teixeira Lopes, he built his atelier in Vila Nova de Gaia, which nowadays houses a museum (the Casa-Museu Teixeira Lopes) dedicated to his work. He was professor of the School of Fine Arts of Porto for many years.

Works 
Teixeira Lopes dealt mostly with allegoric, historical and religious themes, using clay, marble and bronze as materials. His vast work dots public spaces, palaces and churches in Portugal.

References

1866 births
1942 deaths
University of Porto alumni
People from Vila Nova de Gaia
19th-century Portuguese people
19th-century sculptors
20th-century sculptors
19th-century Portuguese sculptors
19th-century male artists
Male sculptors